The Rural Municipality of Usborne No. 310 is a rural municipality (RM) in the Canadian province of Saskatchewan within Census Division No. 11 and  Division No. 5. It is located in the central portion of the province.

History 
The RM of Usborne No. 310 incorporated as a rural municipality on December 13, 1909.

Geography

Communities and localities 
The following urban municipalities are surrounded by the RM.

Towns
 Lanigan

Villages
 Drake

The following unincorporated communities are within the RM.

Organized hamlets
 Guernsey (dissolved as a village, December 31, 2005)

Localities
 Lockwood (dissolved as a village, January 1, 2002)

Demographics 

Attractions 
 Lanigan & District Heritage Centre

Government 
The RM of Usborne No. 310 is governed by an elected municipal council and an appointed administrator that meets on the second Wednesday of every month. The reeve of the RM is Jack Gibney while its administrator is Anna Rintoul. The RM's office is located in Lanigan.

See also 
List of rural municipalities in Saskatchewan

References 

Usborne

Division No. 11, Saskatchewan